Francis William Carlow (born 14 May 1903) was a Scottish footballer who played for Partick Thistle and Dumbarton.

References

1903 births
Scottish footballers
Dumbarton F.C. players
Partick Thistle F.C. players
Scottish Football League players
Year of death missing
Association football forwards